"C'mon Let's Do It" is a song written by Jimmy Manzie and Glenn A. Baker and recorded by Australian band Ol' 55. The song was released in January 1977 and peaked at number 24 on the Australian Kent Music Report, becoming the band's second top ten single.

Track listing
 7" (K-6659)
Side A	"C'mon Let's Do It" - 2:38
Side B "Teenager In Love" - 2:45

Charts

References

1976 songs
1977 singles
Ol' 55 (band) songs
Songs written by Jimmy Manzie
Mushroom Records singles